was a major general in the Imperial Japanese Army in the Second Sino-Japanese War.

A native of Ishikawa prefecture, Nakamura graduated from the 25th class of the Imperial Japanese Army Academy in 1913 and from the 32nd class of the Army Staff College in 1920. He was assigned as a military attaché to France in 1924 to 1927 and later served as resident officer in Italy from 1933-1934.

From 1936-1938 Nakamura served as Chief of Staff of the IJA 12th Division. He was promoted to major general in 1939, and was commanding the IJA 21st Infantry Brigade of the 5th Division during the Battle of South Guangxi in 1939. During the battle, his brigade was mauled and Nakamura was killed in action at the Battle of Kunlun Pass. He was posthumously promoted to lieutenant general.

References

Books

External links

Notes 

1892 births
1939 deaths
Military personnel from Ishikawa Prefecture
Japanese generals
Japanese military personnel of World War II
Japanese military personnel killed in World War II